Cycas curranii (Curran's pitogo) is a species of cycad endemic to the Philippines.

Range
There are two subpopulations of Cycas curranii.
Mount Beaufort in the Malinao River watershed, Palawan
Bongabon and Mansalay, Mindoro Oriental province

In Palawan, it is also found in Puerto Princesa, and Aborlan, and Narra.

References

curranii
Flora of the Philippines
Plants described in 1995